Kľušov is a village and small municipality in Bardejov District in the Prešov Region of north-east Slovakia.

History
In historical records the village was first mentioned in 1330.

Geography
The municipality lies at an altitude of 317 metres and covers an area of 15.358 km².
It has a population of about 1030 people.

Genealogical resources

The records for genealogical research are available at the state archive "Statny Archiv in Presov, Slovakia"

 Roman Catholic church records (births/marriages/deaths): 1755-1895 (parish B)
 Greek Catholic church records (births/marriages/deaths): 1854-1901 (parish B)

See also
 List of municipalities and towns in Slovakia

References

External links
 
 
Surnames of living people in Klusov

Villages and municipalities in Bardejov District
Šariš